Holm of Grimbister is an inhabited tidal islet in the Orkney archipelago of Scotland. Located in the Bay of Firth near Finstown it is connected to Mainland Orkney by a causeway.

Geography
Bay of Firth is an inlet of the Wide Firth that lies to the North. Within the bay and to the north east of the Holm is the companion islet of Damsay. The causeway from Holm of Grimbister connects to the mainland at Holm Point, just north of the mainland settlement of Grimbister. Haswell-Smith (2004) notes that the islet is farmed.

Habitation
Although it is clear that in 2007 the island was inhabited, as it was the residence of a candidate for the Scottish Parliamentary Elections in 2007, it was not listed as such by the Census in 2001.  Press reports in March 2010 confirmed that at that time the population of the island was at least two. The 2011 census recorded the population as three.  In 2016 the island was reported as being on sale for £300 000.

Footnotes

References
 

Islands of the Orkney Islands